Sa Kabila ng Lahat is a 1991 Philippine political drama film directed by Lino Brocka. It stars Dina Bonnevie and Tonton Gutierrez. This is the last film made by Brocka before he was killed in a car accident.

Plot
Maia Robles (Dina Bonnevie) is the host of the investigative news magazine program Punto Blangko (Point Blank) that focuses on political issues, particularly corruption in the government. During the Philippine Television Awards, her show won as Best Public Affairs Show while Maia won as Best Newscaster. She along with her program's segment host and radio commentator Mike Serrano (Tonton Gutierrez) are on their way for their victory party when a hostage taking is taking place, where a Chinese businessman is being held hostage by the notorious criminal named Van Turko. However, Van Turko killed the Chinese businessman was murdered after he answered a phone call by another Chinese syndicate man named Daniel Fu (William Lorenzo). But, Boy Boga (Mark Gil), known as the right hand man of Mayor Ventura Velasco (Ronaldo Valdez) came and told Van Turko to turn himself to the authorities and he will take care of everything. Mike is known as a critic of the mayor who was a former movie actor. 

Maia Robles who also holds an executive post of the network, was offered by Cresencia Velasco (Celeste Legaspi) and Primitivo Mundial (Joonie Gamboa), who also serves as head of the division of city schools for an airtime on their station, but they refused as the documentary series of Mike is supposed to air. Mayor Velasco is also known for his corrupt practices as he favored his father-in-law's business to engage in government services, despite being a Born Again Christian. But, Ventura is known for his extramarital affairs, this include his affair with Maia. He also uses Maia to further increase his popularity as he is seeking for reelection. Maia's close friend Lala Villarica (Nanette Medved) told her about some of the crimes of Boy Boga, making Daniel more furious. During Ventura's guesting on Maia's show, a clip of Boy Boga and his men beating an insane person was shown, during the hostage taking of Van Turko. When Boy Boga was invited by Daniel, policemen who was with Boy arrested Lala, there she sought the help of Maia, who in turn asked to Ventura. Ventura ordered the release of Lala, where she decided to stay with Maia. Maia also discovered that Van Turko has a backer at the City Hall. When Boy Boga's men are about to make a transaction with another drug syndicate, they were killed by policemen headed by Major Blin. Boga put the blame on Daniel because of what happened. Lala stole Maia's jewelries and car, despite pleading from her housemaid. Mike is now working on a documentary entitled Lungsod ng Basag na Pangarap (City of Broken Dreams). One night, Ventura suffered a heart attack on Maia's condominium unit. The news report claimed that Ventura suffered a heart attack at a hotel and is scheduled for a heart bypass surgery in the United States. Cresencia went into Maia's unit and discovered some of the gifts from the mayor. While at the salon, Cresencia attacked Maia calling her a whore because of her affair with Ventura. With the help of Boy Boga, Van Turko was escaped, while his men beaten up Daniel Fu and dropped a grenade on him and killed him due to the explosion. Lala, who was disoriented, went on top of a building trying to kill herself. But Maia came and pleaded Lala to go down. This happened after the death of Daniel, but Maia convinced her that his death was an accident and some rightists soldiers were responsible for this. Afterwards, Lala went down and was brought to the wake of Daniel. But, on their way, the broadcast van was shot by Van Turko, killing Lala. 

When news about Maia and Ventura's affair circulated, she was removed from her shows and the station. Now, her life is in trouble as she was ordered by Van Turko to be murdered. When Van Turko robbed a convenience store, a store crew called the police station and there they shot him. He then watched a news report saying that Van Turko has a backer at the City Hall, who turned out to be Boy Boga. Mike's documentary was pulled out from airing after Priming lobbied to the management of the station. Van Turko asked Maia's help and went to Mike. There, Van Turko confessed that he was part of the Hit Squad formed by Boy Boga for Mayor Velasco's re-election bid and they are involved in gun smuggling and drugs. They're also involved in killing of some of Mayor's critics. Policemen came, that made Van Turko furious. Mike said that he called them because they might be killed by Van Turko, but Maia said that Boy Boga is in charge of everything including the police. Maia, Mike and Van Turko escaped taking the camera with the recorded confession of Van Turko, but Boy Boga blocked them. He then shot Mike, but he shielded Maia when Boga was about to shoot her. Van Turko then shot Boy Boga but Boga's men shot him killing him. Mike told Maia to keep the camera and the tape before passing away. Mayor Velasco died because of complications of his heart bypass surgery, while Cresencia and Priming were charged of graft and corruption.

At the Philippine Television Awards, Mike was posthumously awarded as the Best Television  Journalist of the Year for his documentary series. Maia accepted the award on his behalf and as per request of Mike's parents to accept the award for their late son. She also told that his documentary series is about to air. In her speech, she said that she learned everything form Mike about being brave and to be fearless in telling the truth.

Cast
 Dina Bonnevie as Maria Robles
 Tonton Gutierrez as Mike Serrano
 Nanette Medved as Lala Serrano
 Ronaldo Valdez as Mayor Ventura Velasco
 Mark Gil as Boy Boga
 William Lorenzo as Daniel Fu
 Rey Sagum as Van Turko
 Joonee Gamboa as Primitivo Mundial
 Menggie Cobarrubias as Eugene
 Celeste Legaspi as Cresencia Velasco

Awards
The film was awarded Best Picture and Best Director by the Young Critics Circle and the Philippine Movie Press Club.

See also
 Makiusap Ka sa Diyos

References

External links
 

1991 films
1991 drama films
Films directed by Lino Brocka
Philippine political thriller films
Films about the illegal drug trade
Philippine drama films
Viva Films films